Shades of blue are the colours considered to be similar to the most typical blues.

Shades of Blue may also refer to:

Music 
 Shades of Blue, a 1960s Irish rock band featuring future Thin Lizzy guitarist Eric Bell
 The Shades of Blue, an American vocal group
 Shades of Blue (Ben E. King album) (1993)
 Shades of Blue (Madlib album) (2003)
 Shades of Blue, a 1964 album by the Rendell–Carr Quintet
 Shades of Blue, a 1991 EP by The The
 "Shades of Blue", a song by Chris Child featured in Amplitude

Other uses  
Shades of Blue (TV series), a 2016 American police drama
 Shades of Blue, a 1999–2002 comic book and recipient of the 2000 Lulu Award

See also
 "Shade of Blue", a 2003 song by Black Rebel Motorcycle Club from Take Them On, On Your Own